Ramarama, previously known as Sheppards Bush, is a small community at the far south of the Auckland Region in New Zealand's North Island, located just to the north of the Bombay Hills (a point commonly regarded as the most southern part of the Auckland region).  Ramarama has an off-ramp at exit 466 on the motorway south of Auckland.  The suburb is effectively sliced in two by the motorway, this section of which was constructed in 1978.

The main settlement of Ramarama contains a convenience store and several small businesses. Most of the land in the area is made up of market gardens, farms and lifestyle blocks as would be expected from the entirely rural region in which it is located.  There are several floral/garden/nursery businesses with large glasshouses and a number of poultry/egg producing farms in the surrounding area.  

Ramarama is named after ramarama, a small tree with leaves that can cure bruises if crushed.

History
Ramarama was originally only bushland and also there was a pā site inhabited by the Ngāti Pou tribe of the Māori. It also hid pathways between Tamaki, Hauraki and the Waikato.

In the 1850s, the British built the Great South Road through the land. At the time of the Waikato War, the area was known as Sheppards Bush.

Reverend McDonald, a famed priest at the time, decided to build a church, where the Pratts Road Cemetery stands now. The church was called Saint Brigids and also functioned as a school. The church itself was moved to Selwyn Oaks, but the school was called Maketu School and henceforth Ramarama School. 

The Te Maketu Waterfall is hidden behind the Pratts Road Cemetery. Reverend McDonald wrote a book on it called “The Well Known Secret of the Waterfall”.

 Country Women's Institute
The Ramarama branch of the Country Women's Institute, like many women's CWI groups across New Zealand supported the women and their families in the area. First formed in Ramarama on May 10th 1933, it took a very active part in raising money for the building of the Ramarama Hall. They held a Queen Carnival and took an active part in all other fund raising for the project. 

The Northern Military District Convalescent Depot, opened in December 1942 as a place for troops to recover. It was between Ramarama and Bombay. In late 1945 ash from Ruapehu polluted the water supply of the Chateau and patients who had been housed there were evacuated to what then became Raventhorpe psychiatric hospital. At the 1951 Census 278 people were living at the hospital. The hospital closed about 1991 and the land was sold, to become what is now Martyn Farm Estate.

Demographics

Ramarama had a population of 1,977 at the 2018 New Zealand census, an increase of 48 people (2.5%) since the 2013 census, and an increase of 60 people (3.1%) since the 2006 census. There were 663 households, comprising 1,011 males and 966 females, giving a sex ratio of 1.05 males per female. The median age was 45.2 years (compared with 37.4 years nationally), with 351 people (17.8%) aged under 15 years, 348 (17.6%) aged 15 to 29, 996 (50.4%) aged 30 to 64, and 285 (14.4%) aged 65 or older.

Ethnicities were 86.0% European/Pākehā, 11.8% Māori, 5.0% Pacific peoples, 6.8% Asian, and 1.7% other ethnicities. People may identify with more than one ethnicity.

The percentage of people born overseas was 18.4, compared with 27.1% nationally.

Although some people chose not to answer the census's question about religious affiliation, 53.7% had no religion, 36.6% were Christian, 0.5% had Māori religious beliefs, 1.2% were Hindu, 1.1% were Muslim, 0.3% were Buddhist and 2.0% had other religions.

Of those at least 15 years old, 378 (23.2%) people had a bachelor's or higher degree, and 276 (17.0%) people had no formal qualifications. The median income was $42,500, compared with $31,800 nationally. 453 people (27.9%) earned over $70,000 compared to 17.2% nationally. The employment status of those at least 15 was that 906 (55.7%) people were employed full-time, 267 (16.4%) were part-time, and 36 (2.2%) were unemployed.

Education

Places of interest

Te Maketu Falls - This is a tranquil waterfall about five minutes' walk from Pratts Rd Cemetery. With a large swimming hole at the base of the waterfall, it is an awe-inspiring place to walk to, have a swim or photograph.

Pratts Road Cemetery - A place to remember the dead, especially soldiers who fought in the war

St Brigid’s Church site - This is the site of the Catholic Church that was closed down in 1969, 45 years after it was opened in 1924. As most of the English and Irish immigrants were Catholic it was decided that a church be opened for bible and Sunday school sessions. 

In the suburb of Ramarama, the Drury Stevensons Quarry is located about five to ten minutes from Pratts Road Cemetery. This is a multimillion-dollar business, which produces 84,000 tons of rock and aggregates.

Notable people
Jane Mander, novelist, was born in Ramarama on 9 April 1877.

External links
  The history of the Country Women's Institute in New Zealand

References

Populated places in the Auckland Region